Te Araroa is a town in the Gisborne Region of the North Island of New Zealand. It is situated 175 km north of Gisborne city, along State Highway 35 between Tokata and Awatere. Te Araroa is the birthplace of noted Māori politician Sir Āpirana Ngata. Māori in the area are generally associated with the Ngāti Porou iwi. It is 100 metres from its local beach.

The township has a medical centre, general store, takeaways, fire station and police station. In 2006 the local pub, the Kawakawa Hotel was ravaged by a major fire. Recreational facilities include a children's playground, skate park and rugby domain.

Geography

Te Araroa sits at the base of Whetumatarau at the eastern end of Kawakawa Bay. In the grounds of the local school stands Te Waha o Rerekohu, one of  the largest pōhutukawa trees (Metrosideros excelsa) in New Zealand.

Parks

Te Araroa Domain is the settlement's sports ground and local park.

Demographics
It is part of the wider East Cape statistical area.

Te Araroa had a population of 153 at the 2018 New Zealand census, a decrease of 9 people (−5.6%) since the 2013 census, and a decrease of 15 people (−8.9%) since the 2006 census. There were 54 households, comprising 81 males and 75 females, giving a sex ratio of 1.08 males per female. The median age was 40.5 years (compared with 37.4 years nationally), with 42 people (27.5%) aged under 15 years, 15 (9.8%) aged 15 to 29, 72 (47.1%) aged 30 to 64, and 27 (17.6%) aged 65 or older.

Ethnicities were 17.6% European/Pākehā, 92.2% Māori, and 2.0% Pacific peoples. People may identify with more than one ethnicity.

Although some people chose not to answer the census's question about religious affiliation, 33.3% had no religion, 60.8% were Christian, and 3.9% had Māori religious beliefs.

Of those at least 15 years old, 12 (10.8%) people had a bachelor's or higher degree, and 21 (18.9%) people had no formal qualifications. The median income was $19,200, compared with $31,800 nationally. 3 people (2.7%) earned over $70,000 compared to 17.2% nationally. The employment status of those at least 15 was that 36 (32.4%) people were employed full-time, 24 (21.6%) were part-time, and 6 (5.4%) were unemployed.

Marae

Hinerupe Marae

The local Hinerupe Marae and meeting house, located in the township, is a tribal meeting place of the Ngāti Porou hapū of Ngāti Tuere, Te Whānau a Hinerupe, Te Whānau a Karuai and Te Whānau a Tuwhakairiora.

In 1996 an electrical fire destroyed part of Hinerupe Marae. The community rallied to raise funds to build a new marae on the same site as the former  130-year-old building. One major fundraising event The Out of the Ashes Festival saw New Zealand performers Sir Howard Morrison, Dave Dobbyn, Neil Finn and Annie Crummer perform at the Te Araroa Domain. The new marae complex opened on 30 March 2002.

In October 2020, the Government committed $5,756,639 from the Provincial Growth Fund to upgrade the marae and 28 others in the Gisborne District. The funding was expected to create 205 jobs.

Other marae

Four other Ngāti Porou marae are also located in the valley.

Punaruku Marae and Te Pikitanga meeting house, located north of the township, is a meeting place of Ngāti Kahu.

The Tutua or Paerauta Marae and Te Poho o Tamakoro meeting house, located west of the township, is a meeting place of Ngāi Tamakoro and Ngāti Tuere. It also received Government funding for an upgrade in October 2020.

Hurae or Te Kahika Marae and meeting house, also located south of the township, is also a meeting place of Te Whānau a Hinerupe. It also received Government funding for an upgrade in October 2020.

Awatere Marae and Te Aotaihi meeting house, located south of the township, is a meeting place of Te Whānau a Hinerupe. It received $101,200 from the Provincial Growth Fund in 2020 for upgrade work.

Education

Te Waha o Rerekohu Area School is a Year 1–13 co-educational state area school with a roll of  students as of

References 

Populated places in the Gisborne District